George A. Schastey (1839–1894) was an American Gilded Age cabinet maker and decorator.

Childhood
Schastey was born in Merseburg, Germany (then Prussia), and immigrated to New York with his family in 1849. He was apprenticed as an upholsterer, and served in the Civil War.

After the War he  worked for a number of cabinetmakers, including the Herter Brothers. He opened a factory of his own in 1873. He created lavish interiors for the wealthy in New York as well and in San Francisco on Nob Hill. His clients included the "Big Four" railroad magnates, Leland Stanford, Mark Hopkins, Jr., Charles Crocker, and Henry E. Huntington. He designed the William J. Graham House in Reno, Nevada.

Schastey's work is exhibited at the Metropolitan Museum of Art and the Brooklyn Museum in New York, and Virginia Museum of Fine Arts in Richmond, among others.

Gallery

References

American cabinetmakers
American furniture designers
American woodworkers
Interior design
Furniture companies of the United States